OpenEmbedded is a build automation framework and cross-compile environment used to create Linux distributions for embedded devices. The OpenEmbedded framework is developed by the OpenEmbedded community, which was formally established in 2003. OpenEmbedded is the recommended build system of the Yocto Project, which is a Linux Foundation workgroup that assists commercial companies in the development of Linux-based systems for embedded products.

The build system is based on BitBake "recipes", which specify how a particular package is built but also include lists of dependencies and source code locations, as well as for instructions on how to install and remove a compiled package. OpenEmbedded tools use these recipes to fetch and patch source code, compile and link binaries, produce binary packages (ipk, deb, rpm), and create bootable images.

Historically, OpenEmbedded's collection of recipes was stored in a single repository, and the metadata was structured in a form now called "OpenEmbedded-Classic". By 2010, it had become increasingly difficult to manage the ever-growing number of recipes. To resolve this, recipe metadata was split into multiple layers. The lowest layer, which includes platform-independent and distribution-independent meta data is called "OpenEmbedded-Core". Architecture-specific, application-specific and distribution-dependent instructions are applied in appropriate target support layers that can override or complement the instructions from lower layers. Additionally, changes to the recipes at the core layer are now managed with a pull model: instead of committing their changes directly to the repository (as was previously the case), developers now send their patches to the mailing list. The patches, if approved, are then merged (pulled) by a maintainer. 

The OpenEmbedded framework can be installed and automatically updated via Git.

History 

The OpenEmbedded Project (OE for short) was created by Chris Larson, Michael Lauer, and Holger Schurig, merging the achievements of OpenZaurus with contributions from projects like Familiar Linux and OpenSIMpad into a common codebase. OpenEmbedded superseded these projects and was used to build any of them from the same code base.

The OpenEmbedded-Core Project (OE-Core for short) resulted from the merge of the Yocto Project with OpenEmbedded. All package recipes are since then maintained through OpenEmbedded-Core.

Layer organisation 
OpenEmbedded-Core has adapted this layered structure in the merge with Yocto and new layer entries were added over time.  The Layers represent a structure which is only of declarative nature. The specific entries are stricter in the scope of deciding which entry provides which packages. Overview of layers is available in: 

 Developer layer
 The user-defined layer for custom Bitbake recipes.  Embedded system software developers would place their recipe here if the software would not fit the commercial or base layer.

 Commercial layer
 Packages, plugins, and configurations from open source vendors go in this layer.

 UI-specific layer
 Layers currently present within the meta-openembedded layer:
 meta-efl (Enlightenment window manager)
 meta-gnome (GNOME window manager)
 meta-gpe (GPE window manager)
 meta-xfce (Xfce window manager)

 Hardware-specific layer
 meta-efikamx (Efika devices)
 meta-fsl-arm (Freescale Semiconductor officially supported development boards)
 meta-fsl-arm-extra (Freescale Semiconductor community supported boards)
 meta-handheld (Personal digital assistants, PDAs)
 meta-intel (Intel embedded devices)
 meta-nslu2 (NSLU2 devices)
 meta-openpandora (Openpandora devices)
 meta-smartphone (various smartphone devices)
 meta-ti (Texas Instruments devices)
 meta-xilinx (Xilinx devices)
 meta-altera (Altera devices)
 meta-ettus (Ettus Research USRP SDR devices)
 (Others)

 Yocto layer
 meta-yocto (Yocto Project layer)

 OpenEmbedded-Core layer
 openembedded-core
 meta-openembedded

Distributions supported
In OpenEmbedded-Classic, the configurations from Base- to the UI-Layer can be supplemented by various Linux distributions. The following list is available for OpenEmbedded:
 Ångström distribution
 KaliOS
 Openmoko
 SHR
 SlugOS
 WebOS
 Others

Supported hardware
Various devices are supported:

 Boards and processors
 The BeagleBoard from Texas Instruments, and a variety of devices based on an ARM CPU are supported.

 Smartphones
 Smartphones like the Nokia N800 and Neo FreeRunner are supported.

 Porting to new hardware
 The constellation of OpenEmbedded, especially the open design, allows it to get OpenEmbedded to adapt new hardware fairly easy.

See also

 BitBake
 Buildroot
 Emdebian Grip
 Familiar Linux
 Openpandora
 OpenZaurus
 Yocto Project
T2 SDE

References

External links
 
 FOSDEM'05 presentation of OpenEmbedded
 FOSDEM'07 presentation of OpenEmbedded
 ELC'08 presentation of OpenEmbedded

Build automation
Embedded Linux
Personal digital assistant software
Software using the MIT license